Donckers Koffie–Jelly Belly was a Belgian UCI Continental cycling team that competed from 2010 to 2011.

Major results
2010
 Grote 1-MeiPrijs, Jan Kuyckx
2011
 Handzame Classic, Steve Schets

References

Defunct cycling teams based in Belgium
Cycling teams established in 2010
Cycling teams disestablished in 2011
UCI Continental Teams (Europe)